Navitas may refer to:

 Navitas Limited, an Australian education services provider
 Navitas Park, a building in Aarhus, Denmark
 Navitas Land and Mineral Corporation, an American oil and gas exploration, development and production firm
 Navitas Petroleum, an Israeli oil & natural gas exploration company